My Apocalypse (originally titled Quality Time) is a 2008 independent  film starring Corin Nemec, Bruce Weitz, Nancy Allen, John de Lancie, Gail Strickland, Meredith Salenger, and Jesse Harper.

Directed and produced by Chris LaMont, the screenplay was written by LaMont, Craig Belanger, and Jay Holben.

Although My Apocalypse  was filmed in 1997, it was not released until 2008, due to the funding that LaMont had available to him as an independent filmmaker.  With the extensive amount of CGI and digital FX required to make the film meet his specific vision, the digital film revolution gained steam and he was able to complete the film with special visual FX Director Rene de la Fuente. Its world premiere was a screening at the Boston Underground Film Festival 2008. It has since gone on to play the Sydney Underground Film Festival, River's Edge Film Festival, New Jersey Film Festival, Arizona International Film Festival, and the Strasbourg (France) International Film Festival.

As of February 2013, the film is available to be viewed via live stream to Netflix members.

Synopsis
My Apocalypse is the surrealistic story of Stewart Savage (played by Nemec), who is actually the notorious serial killer known as the North City Stalker. Stewart still lives with his parents, Jack (played by Weitz) and Linda (played by Allen), in an overcrowded future world where the polar ice caps have melted and the military controls all aspects of everyday life. The Savages only have their apartment for half a day. At 6 pm, they must turn it over to Nathan Eastman (played by de Lancie), his wife Victoria (played by Strickland), and their son Victor (played by Harper).

Stewart, however, sees everything as idyllic and in bright colors; his family is wholesome and happy and his girlfriend adores him. In reality, he is very much insane; he hates his meaningless job, strangles his girlfriends, and prefers the psychotic solace of the world inside his head.

He has just murdered his latest girlfriend, Susan Stone (played by Salenger). Completely unaware of the difference between fantasy and the state of things as they actually exist, he is convinced that his fiancée is still alive and brings her home to meet his parents at his father's birthday party.

Aware of their son's activities, the helpless Savages are full of good cheer and play along with his sick delusions at the party, while actually frightened and angry. While acting as though it is mainly embarrassing, Stewart's annoyed parents attempt to bag the fresh victim before the Eastmans arrive.

Though his parents have become complacent with his psychosis, the people who share the apartment are less sympathetic. Stewart becomes more unhinged when they show up. Descending further into madness, he pulls a gun and starts waving it around as he holds his family and the Eastmans hostage.

More horrific than being held at gunpoint by a serial killer are the truths that surface when they are forced to speak candidly to one another.

Main cast
Corin Nemec as Stewart Savage
Bruce Weitz as Jack Savage
Nancy Allen as Linda Savage
John de Lancie as Nathan Eastman
Gail Strickland as Victoria Eastman
Meredith Salenger as Susan Stone
Jesse Harper as Victor Eastman

External links

Boston Underground Film Festival 2008 Presents Quality Time
Arizona International Film Festival – Quality Time
Sydney Underground Film Festival – Quality Time
Quality Time Trailer

References

2008 films
American independent films
American serial killer films
American films based on plays
Films about dysfunctional families
Films set in the future
American dystopian films
Overpopulation fiction
2000s English-language films
2000s American films